Mirdza Ķempe (later Naikovska) ( in Liepāja – 12 April 1974 in Riga) was a Soviet and Latvian poet, writer and translator. She was a recipient of the State Prize of Latvian SSR (1958), USSR State Prize (1967), and the Order of the Red Banner of Labour.

Biography 
Mirdza Ķempe was born into a working-class family in Liepāja, Latvia. From 1914 to 1926, she lived in Tosmare at Ģen. Baloža st., 47; later she and her family lived at Bernatu st., 41 in Liepāja. In 1915–1919, she studied at the 1st Liepāja primary school (now the 5th Liepāja school). Ķempe graduated from the 1st Liepāja secondary school in 1925. Her first verse, "Ne jums!", was published in the "Kurzemes Vārds" newspaper in 1923. In the same year, she translated Pushkin's Mozart and Salieri into the Latvian language. In 1927, she entered the University of Latvia in Riga. Because of lack of money she had to drop out of the university and in 1928 Ķempe started to work as a continuity announcer for Rīgas radiofons. In 1931, she married writer Eriks Ādamsons.

She translated works from Russian, English, German, Spanish and French. During World War II, she was evacuated to Moscow, Astrakhan and Ivanovo. She wrote plays, lyric miniatures and verses.

Death and legacy
She was buried in Līvu cemetery in Liepāja.

On 9 February 1989 a monument to Mirdza Ķempe was opened in Liepāja (architect Ligita Ulmane), another in Riga. A street in Ezerkrasts district of Liepāja is named after her.

Poetry 
Mirdza Ķempe published 15 collections of poetry, including "Rīta vejš" (1946), "Gaisma akmenī", "Ērkšķuroze" (Dog-rose, 1972), "Mīlestības krāšņais", "Dzintara spogulis" (1968), "Mirkļu mužiba" etc.

Ne jums!

"Ne jums es vaicāšu: kas grēks, kas kauns?
Par velti draudiet man ar tumsas baismu!
Es pati savu dzīvi celšu –
Vienalga man, kur ceļam reiz būs gals…"

Manai Liepājai

"Jūras meita, Zemes māsa.
Mana Liepāja, ko mīlu.
Tavām acīm dzelmes krāsa,
Kurā atspīd debess dzīle."

Awards and honours
She was awarded State Prize of Latvian SSR (1958), USSR State Prize (1967) and the Order of the Red Banner of Labour. In 1971 she received Visva-Bharati University honorary doctor diploma for her works on Urdu language.

Selected works

References

External links
 http://liepajasteatris.lv/25-septembri-roze-bez-erkskiem/

1907 births
1974 deaths
20th-century Latvian poets
20th-century translators
20th-century women writers
People from Liepāja
People from Courland Governorate
University of Latvia alumni
People's Poets of the Latvian SSR
Recipients of the Order of the Red Banner of Labour
Recipients of the USSR State Prize
Pseudonymous women writers
Socialist realism writers
English–Latvian translators
English–Urdu translators
Translators from French
Translators from German
Translators from Russian
Translators from Spanish
Translators of Alexander Pushkin
Translators to Latvian
Latvian translators
Latvian women poets
Soviet translators
Soviet women poets
20th-century pseudonymous writers